Kentucky Moonshine is a 1938 American comedy musical film directed by David Butler and released by 20th Century Fox.

Plot
Radio star Jerry Wade's program ratings are falling and he suggests to his sponsors a show that is different and he goes to Kentucky to find an idea. Caroline, a Kentucky girl in New York trying to crash into radio, learns of Wade's quest and takes her three friends, Harry, Jimmy and Al Ritz, also aspiring to show-business fame, to Kentucky with her, where Wade discovers them in beards, guns, feuds, moonshine and every cliché that fits the hillbillies lifestyle. He stages a broadcast from the hills, which is not heard because of technical difficulties. He takes the whole troupe back to New York with him.

Cast
 Ritz Brothers as Themselves
 Tony Martin as Jerry Wade
 Marjorie Weaver as Caroline
 Slim Summerville as Hank Hatfield
 John Carradine as Reef Hatfield
 Wally Vernon as Gus Bryce
 Berton Churchill as J.B.
 Eddie Collins as 'Spats' Swenson
 Cecil Cunningham as Landlady
 Paul Stanton as Mortimer Hilton
 Mary Treen as 'Sugar' Hatfield
 Francis Ford as Grandpa Hatfield
 The Brian Sisters as Specialty
 Clarence Hummel Wilson as Attorney
 Frank McGlynn, Jr. as Clem Hatfield
 Jan Duggan as Nurse
 Si Jenks as Buckboard Driver
 Irving Bacon as Hotel
 Olin Howland as Tom Slack
 John Hiestand as Radio Announcer 
 Carroll Nye as Radio Announcer
 Tom Hanlon as Radio Announcer

External links
 

1938 films
1938 comedy films
American black-and-white films
Films directed by David Butler
Films set in Kentucky
American comedy films
Films produced by Darryl F. Zanuck
20th Century Fox films
1930s English-language films
1930s American films